The Smith Islands are two Antarctic islands lying close to Tracy Point, the western extremity of Beall Island, in the Windmill Islands. They were first mapped from air photos taken by USN Operation Highjump and Operation Windmill in 1947 and 1948. The islands were named for the US-ACAN for Aerographer's Mate Roger E. Smith, USN, a member of the Wilkes Station party of 1958.

See also
 Composite Gazetteer of Antarctica
 List of Antarctic and subantarctic islands
 Scientific Committee on Antarctic Research
 Territorial claims in Antarctica

External links 

Windmill Islands